Mirth may refer to:

 Gladness and gaiety, especially when expressed by laughter
 Mirth Connect, software for conversion between health record standards
 Mirth Provisions, a cannabis company based in Longview, Washington
 USS Mirth (AM-265), a World War II Admirable-class minesweeper used by the U.S. Navy 1943-1945